Robert Allan Black is an American writer and director, who began his career as an advertising copywriter.  His film writing and directing work includes the feature documentary, Loving Henri (2017), about freed Nazi slave turned philanthropist, Henri Landwirth (1927-2018), which was shot over the span of 14 years.

Early life 
Born in Fort Worth, Texas, Robert Allan Black is the son of U.S. Army colonel, Forrest Coy Black, and U.S. Army nurse, Maryanne McDonough Black. He lived on various Army bases across America and in Japan. Upon graduating from San Jose State University, Black wrote two scripts: Remember The Thrill, loosely based on his years playing college football; and Austin City Limits, a love affair set in Washington, DC and a Texas Honky-Tonk.

Career 
In 1970, Black got a job as a copywriter at Foote, Cone & Belding Advertising (FCB) in San Francisco, California. He worked as a copywriter at several advertising agencies throughout the 1970s, including Honig-Cooper & Harrington, Ketchum Advertising, and Bozell & Jacobs, where he created the first Atari campaign, "Doreen, Come On Home". From 1976 through 1979, Black did freelance work under the moniker, Robert Allan Black Productions, for the founder of Atari, Nolan Bushnell. Black created the entertainment portion and named the endeavor, Chuck E. Cheese's Pizza Time Theater.

During the late 1970s and throughout the 1980s, Black developed his serial commercial campaigns, which he built as films, with character development, character arcs, turning points, and cliffhangers.

Black's serial advertising campaigns were reviewed in The New York Times which published an article stating, "probably never before has an advertiser used such elaborate plots, spread over so many commercials."

In November 1988, after being pursued by several film companies to direct, he left FCB and joined Travisano, DiGiacomo, Black films. Backstage Shoot magazine, the predecessor to the publication Shoot Magazine, printed a front-page article about his departure from advertising, stating, "The advertising industry has lost a true visionary, an inspired creative, who launched a new genre of broadcast advertising - the serialized commercial for Pacific Bell." Black was on retainer with FCB as Creative Director on Holland America Cruise Line and Westours through 1989.

Black won the Mercury Award given to the best Marketed Travel Campaign in the World for his work on Holland American Cruise Line/Westours. His work has won Clios, Cannes Lions, Mobius Gold, Andy's, Addys, and several Best of Show. He was nominated by the Directors Guild of America for "Outstanding Directorial Achievement in Commercials".

In 1999, Black directed an episode of the ABC television drama, Once and Again, starring Sela Ward and Billy Campbell.

In 1992, Black wrote and directed, Let Them Run Free (1992), for the Starbright Children's Foundation to benefit terminally ill children. The film was commissioned by Steven Spielberg and executive produced by Kathleen Kennedy. Black donated his creative work and filmmaking to the film, along with funding the finishing of the film.

In 2000, Black began shooting a documentary film called Borrowing Time, which he partially funded.  Later this story evolved into a feature documentary titled, Loving Henri (2017). It was filmed over a 14-year period in locations around the world and follows the journey of freed Nazi slave turned philanthropist, Henri Landwirth (1927-2018), as he attempts to free himself of demons that remain. Black is the managing partner of Loving Henri, LLC.

References 

American film directors
Living people
American writers
People from Fort Worth, Texas
Year of birth missing (living people)